Marihatag, officially the Municipality of Marihatag (Surigaonon: Lungsod nan Marihatag); (Indonesian: Kotamadya Marihatag) , is a 3rd class municipality in the province of Surigao del Sur, Philippines. According to the 2020 census, it has a population of 19,441 people.

It was known as Oteiza until 1955.

The municipality hosts the "Balik-Marihatag" Festival which literally means going back home to Marihatag.

Etymology
Its name is a concatenation of Maria Ihatag.

Geography

Barangays
Marihatag is politically subdivided into 12 barangays.
 Alegria
 Amontay
 Antipolo
 Arorogan
 Bayan (formerly Hinogbakan)
 Mahaba
 Mararag
 Poblacion
 San Antonio
 San Isidro
 San Pedro
 Sta Cruz

Climate

Marihatag has a tropical rainforest climate (Af) with heavy to very heavy rainfall year-round and with extremely heavy rainfall in January.

Demographics

Economy

See also
List of renamed cities and municipalities in the Philippines

References

External links
 Marihatag Profile at PhilAtlas.com
 Marihatag Profile at the DTI Cities and Municipalities Competitive Index
 [ Philippine Standard Geographic Code]
 Philippine Census Information
 Local Governance Performance Management System

Municipalities of Surigao del Sur